Zhang Huajun (born 1 October 2001) is a Chinese football player who is currently a free agent.

Early life and career

Born in 2002, Zhang studied in the High School Affiliated to Renmin University of China, participated in the Chinese High School Football Championship with the football team of the High School Affiliated to Renmin University, and was selected for the Chinese High School Football League to compete in the Asian High School U18 Football Championship and other events. 

In 2021, Zhang Huajun represented Beijing in the National Middle School Games and won the runner-up, receiving the attention of many professional teams , joining the Hebei Zhuoao team in the second league in the 2021 season.

Senior career

He made his debut against Shanghai Port F.C. on 4 June 2022, coming on as a substitute for Hu Rentian. 

He scored his first goal aganist Henan Songshan Longmen F.C. on 21st August 2022. 

Huajun played 62 minutes in Wuhan Yangtze's final ever league match, coming off for Pi Ziyang.

After Wuhan Yangtze's dissolution in 2023, Huajun was released from his contract.

Style of play

Zhang is known for his corner kick ability.

References

External links

Living people
2001 births
Chinese footballers